Corina Brouder is an American singer and harpist, born in The Bronx, New York City. As a child, her sister, Christina, spent some time in hospital after a hit and run incident, and Corina and her other siblings started entertaining her recovering sister and the other children in the ward. Eventually the family found themselves in demand to perform at similar venues, and, calling themselves The Spirits of Gilbride, began performing professionally. The group consists of Corina, Christina, Cornelia, Neil and Mary Catherine. The group released an album, two videos and singles for Universal Music, and sang the title track on the European version of The Little Vampire (2000) soundtrack album.

Brouder was discovered by John Barry and sang "To Love and be Loved" on his Swept from the Sea (1997) soundtrack with lyrics by Tim Rice. She started performing more frequently on her own, often accompanying herself on harp or keyboards, and visited Ireland in 2004 to promote her single, "Another Day," which was recorded in New York City with Swedish record producer Johan Brunkvist. The "B" side, "Change," was written by Brouder and remixed by Joe Hogue.

Brouder appeared on season 1 of America's Got Talent in 2006 and was chosen by David Hasselhoff to perform in the "Wild Card episode." She was joined for one episode by her sister, Cornelia. Hasselhoff and Brouder proceeded to become friends

Brouder also attended Fiorello H. LaGuardia High School of Music & Art and Performing Arts and has a BA from Fordham University. Her siblings have taken on other careers. Christina is a lawyer, Cornelia is a lawyer, Neil is an Environmental Engineer and Mary Catherine is a journalist.  Corina now performs solo, accompanying herself on the harp or piano. She also adds vocals and music to various projects.

In 2017, she became a licensed attorney and is an Associate at Zetlin and De Chiara. Additionally Brouder retains current licenses in nursing, cosmetology and as a real estate broker.

Brouder and her husband have two children.

Albums
 (1994) Sibling Revelry, USA
 (2000) Gilbride, Germany, Metronome (Universal)

Singles

With The Spirits Of Gilbride
 (2000) "Shades of Grey", Germany, Metronome (Universal)
 (2000) "I Can't Help Fallin'", Germany, Metronome (Universal)

Solo
 (2004) "Feel For You", Brouder
 (2004) "Another Day", Brouder Music, Ltd

References

External links 
 Official website
 

Year of birth missing (living people)
Living people
American women singer-songwriters
American harpists
America's Got Talent contestants
21st-century American women